Astrophysics and Space Science is a bimonthly peer-reviewed scientific journal covering  astronomy, astrophysics, and space science and astrophysical aspects of astrobiology. It was established in 1968 and is published by Springer Science+Business Media. From 2016 to 2020 the editors-in-chief were both Prof. Elias Brinks and Prof. Jeremy Mould. Since 2020 the sole editor-in-chief is Prof. Elias Brinks. Other editors-in-chief in the past have been Zdeněk Kopal (Univ. of Manchester)  (1968-1993) and Michael A. Dopita (Australian National University) (1994-2015).

Abstracting and indexing 
The journal is abstracted and indexed in the following databases:

According to the Journal Citation Reports, the journal has a 2020 impact factor of 1.830.

References

External links 
 

Space science journals
Publications established in 1968
Springer Science+Business Media academic journals
Bimonthly journals
Astrophysics journals
English-language journals
Plasma science journals